The Bible and Its Story, Taught By One Thousand Picture Lessons is a pedagogical children's book series in 10 volumes published Francis R. Niglutsch in 1908 and 1909 illustrating pivotal scenes from the Holy Bible; edited by Charles F. Horne, et al., it is in the public domain. The notable Victorian artist Sir Lawrence Alma-Tadema's etchings are from late in his career.

See also

References

Christian Bible
1908 children's books